Hörður Axel Vilhjálmsson (born 18 December 1988) is an Icelandic basketball player and coach. He currently plays for Keflavík of the Úrvalsdeild karla and the Icelandic national team.

Professional career
Hörður began his career at the age of 15 in his home in Fjölnir Reykjavík. Through his brother was a basketball coach in Iceland, he came to the basketball. At 17, he moved to Spain, but returned a short period of time to Iceland. After starring again in Spain for a second division in the preseason, he finally played for the Icelandic Úrvalsdeild club Keflavík. In 2009 he set the Úrvalsdeild record for most minutes played in a single game when he played all 60 minutes in a quadruple overtime game against KR. In 2010/11 he appeared in 30 games averaging 33 minutes on the floor and delivered an average of 16.5 points. With 7.3 assists, he was the third-best assist provider and he also had 2.5 steals per game being the second best player in the league in this category.

In 2011 Hörður signed Mitteldeutscher BC. He received a three-year contract, which was valid in both the ProA and in the Basketball Bundesliga. In 37 games, he averaged 23 minutes on the floor and gave off 9.6 points and 2.3 assists. Mitteldeutscher BC reserved the right in the contract, to terminate the cooperation. On 17 June 2013 it was announced that Hörður made use of the option to buy out of his existing contract for a four-figure sum. This made the club as well as fans of incomprehension and disappointment as was counted on him.

Due to the Eurobasket 2013 and the related absence of some players in the Spanish first division, Hörður played with Bilbao Basket for the preseason. After preparation of completed time he moved within the league to CB Valladolid. During the season he switched back to Mitteldeutscher BC. On 3 June 2014, the club announced to engage Hörður again.

On 18 August 2015 he signed Aries Trikala of the Greek Basket League. In October, he left the club and signed with ČEZ Nymburk. On 6 January 2016 he rejoined Aries Trikala for the rest of the season.

On 1 July 2016 he joined Rethymno Cretan Kings. After Antonis Constantinides became the head coach of the club, Hörður left the club before appearing in a single game. The 2016–17 season he started with Keflavík but after only two games he left the club, and on 21 October 2016 he signed with Belgian club Limburg United. He left Limburg after appearing in five games, and returned to Keflavík. On 12 April 2017, the day after being eliminated with Keflavík from the Icelandic semi-finals, he signed with Bondi Ferrara of the Italian Serie A2 Basket.

On 5 July 2017 he signed with Astana of the VTB United League. In December 2017, Hörður left the club and expected to sign back with Keflavík. On December 27, Hörður signed with Keflavík for the rest of the 2017–18 season.

On 29 March 2018, after Keflavík had been eliminated from the Úrvalsdeild playoffs, Hörður signed with Kymis of the Greek Basket League.

In July 2018, Hörður signed with Keflavík once again. Following the 2020-21 season he was named the Úrvalsdeild Domestic Player of the Year and the Defensive Player of the Year.

National team career
Hörður was a part of the first Icelandic national basketball team to qualify for a EuroBasket tournament, in 2015. He also played at EuroBasket 2015 with Iceland, where he averaged 6.8 points and 2.2 assists per game.

Coaching career
On 8 May 2019, Hörður was announced as an assistant coach to the Keflavík women's team. In May 2022, he was hired as the head coach of Keflavík women's team.

Titles, awards and achievements

Germany

Titles
 ProA champion: 2012

Iceland

Titles
 Icelandic Champion: 2010
 Icelandic Super Cup: 2008

Awards
 Úrvalsdeild Defense Player of the Year: 2011
 Úrvalsdeild Young Player of the Year: 2006
 Úrvalsdeild Domestic All-First Team: 2010, 2011

Achievements
 Úrvalsdeild assist leader: 2017, 2020, 2021, 2022

References

External links
official Blog of Hörður Vilhjálmsson
Hörður Vilhjálmsson at eurobasket.com
Hörður Vilhjálmsson at realgm.com

1988 births
Living people
Aries Trikala B.C. players
BC Astana players
CB Gran Canaria players
CB Valladolid players
Basketball Nymburk players
Club Melilla Baloncesto players
Hörður Vilhjálmsson
Hörður Vilhjálmsson
Hörður Vilhjálmsson
Hörður Vilhjálmsson
Hörður Vilhjálmsson
Hörður Vilhjálmsson
Hörður Vilhjálmsson
Hörður Vilhjálmsson
Liga ACB players
Limburg United players
Mitteldeutscher BC players
Hörður Vilhjálmsson
Point guards
Hörður Vilhjálmsson
Hörður Vilhjálmsson